

Events

January

 January 1 – Unix time epoch reached at 00:00:00 UTC.
 January 5 – The 7.1  Tonghai earthquake shakes Tonghai County, Yunnan province, China, with a maximum Mercalli intensity of X (Extreme). Between 10,000 and 14,621 were killed and 26,783 were injured.
 January 14 – Biafra capitulates, ending the Nigerian Civil War.
 January 15 – After a 32-month fight for independence from Nigeria, Biafran forces under Philip Effiong formally surrender to General Yakubu Gowon.

February

 February 1 – The Benavídez rail disaster near Buenos Aires, Argentina, kills 236.
 February 10 – An avalanche at Val-d'Isère, France, kills 41 tourists.
 February 11 – Ohsumi, Japan's first satellite, is launched on a Lambda-4 rocket.
 February 22 – Guyana becomes a Republic within the Commonwealth of Nations.

March

 March 1 – Rhodesia severs its last tie with the United Kingdom, declaring itself a republic.
 March 4 — All 57 men aboard the French submarine Eurydice (S644) are killed when the vessel implodes while making a practice dive in the Mediterranean Sea.
 March 5 – The Nuclear Non-Proliferation Treaty goes into effect, after ratification by 56 nations.
 March 6 – Süleyman Demirel of AP forms the new government of Turkey (32nd government).
 March 12 – Citroën introduces the Citroën SM, the fastest front-wheel drive auto in the world at that time, at the annual Geneva Motor Show in Switzerland.
 March 15 – The Expo '70 World's Fair opens in Suita, Osaka, Japan.
 March 16 – The complete New English Bible is published.
 March 18 – General Lon Nol ousts Prince Norodom Sihanouk of Cambodia and holds Queen Sisowath Kossamak under house arrest.
 March 19
Ostpolitik: The leaders of West Germany and East Germany meet at a summit for the first time since Germany's division into two republics. West German Chancellor Willy Brandt is greeted by cheering East German crowds as he arrives in Erfurt for a summit with his counterpart, East German Ministerpräsident Willi Stoph.
 March 20 – The Agency for Cultural and Technical Co-operation (ACCT) (Agence de Coopération Culturelle et Technique) is founded.
 March 21 – All Kinds of Everything, sung by Dana (music and text by Derry Lindsay and Jackie Smith), wins the Eurovision Song Contest 1970 for Ireland.
 March 31
 NASA's Explorer 1, the first American satellite and Explorer program spacecraft, reenters Earth's atmosphere after 12 years in orbit.
 Japan Airlines Flight 351, carrying 131 passengers and 7 crew from Tokyo to Fukuoka, is hijacked by Japanese Red Army members. All passengers and crew are eventually freed.

April

 April 4 – Fragments of burnt human remains believed to be those of Adolf Hitler, Eva Braun, Joseph Goebbels, Magda Goebbels and the Goebbels children are crushed and scattered in the Biederitz river at a KGB center in Magdeburg, East Germany.
 April 8
 A huge gas explosion at a subway construction site in Osaka, Japan, kills 79 and injures over 400.
 Israeli Air Force F-4 Phantom II fighter bombers kill 47 Egyptian school children at an elementary school in what is known as Bahr el-Baqar massacre. The single-floor school is hit by five bombs and two air-to-ground missiles.
 April 10 – In a press release written in mock-interview style, that is included in promotional copies of his first solo album, Paul McCartney announces that he has left The Beatles.
 April 11
 An avalanche at a tuberculosis sanatorium in the French Alps kills 74, mostly young boys.
 Apollo program: Apollo 13 (Jim Lovell, Fred Haise, Jack Swigert) is launched toward the Moon.
 April 13 – An oxygen tank in the Apollo 13 spacecraft explodes, forcing the crew to abort the mission and return in four days.
 April 17 – Apollo program: Apollo 13 splashes down safely in the Pacific.
 April 21 – The Principality of Hutt River "secedes" from Australia (it remains unrecognised by Australia and other nations).
 April 24 – China's first satellite (Dong Fang Hong 1) is launched into orbit using a Long March-1 Rocket (CZ-1).
 April 26 – The World Intellectual Property Organization (WIPO) is founded.

May

 May 4 – Kent State shootings: Four students at Kent State University in Ohio, USA are killed and nine wounded by Ohio National Guardsmen, at a protest against the incursion into Cambodia.
 May 6
 Arms Crisis in the Republic of Ireland: Charles Haughey and Neil Blaney are dismissed as members of the Irish Government, for accusations of their involvement in a plot to import arms for use by the Provisional IRA in Northern Ireland.
 Feyenoord wins the European Cup after a 2–1 win over Celtic.
 May 14
 Ulrike Meinhof helps Andreas Baader escape and create the Red Army Faction in West Germany which exists until 1998.
 In the second day of violent demonstrations at Jackson State University in Jackson, Mississippi, state law enforcement officers fire into the demonstrators, killing 2 and injuring 12.
 May 17 – Thor Heyerdahl sets sail from Morocco on the papyrus boat Ra II, to sail the Atlantic Ocean.
 May 26 – The Soviet Tupolev Tu-144 becomes the first commercial transport to exceed Mach 2.
 May 31
 The 7.9  Ancash earthquake shakes Peru with a maximum Mercalli intensity of VIII (Severe) and a landslide buries the town of Yungay, Peru. Between 66,794 and 70,000 were killed and 50,000 were injured.
 The 1970 FIFA World Cup is inaugurated in Mexico.

June

 June 1 – Soyuz 9, a two-man spacecraft, is launched in the Soviet Union.
 June 4 – Tonga gains independence from the United Kingdom.
 June 8 – A coup in Argentina brings a new junta of service chiefs; on June 18, Roberto M. Levingston becomes President.
 June 12 – NDFLOAG guerrillas attack military garrisons at Izki and Nizwa in Oman.
 June 19 – The Patent Cooperation Treaty is signed into international law, providing a unified procedure for filing patent applications to protect inventions.
 June 21 – Brazil defeats Italy 4–1 to win the 1970 FIFA World Cup in Mexico.

July

 July 3 
 All 112 people on board Dan-Air Flight 1903 are killed when the British De Havilland Comet crashes into mountains north of Barcelona.
The French Army detonates a 914 kiloton thermonuclear device in the Mururoa Atoll. It is the fifth in a series that started on June 15 in their program to perfect a hydrogen bomb small enough to be delivered by a missile.
 July 5 – Air Canada Flight 621 crashes near Toronto International Airport, Toronto, Ontario; all 109 passengers and crew are killed.
 July 12 – Thor Heyerdahl's papyrus boat Ra II arrives in Barbados.
 July 21 – The Aswan High Dam in Egypt is completed.
 July 23 – 1970 Omani coup d'état: Said bin Taimur, Sultan of Muscat and Oman, is deposed in a bloodless palace coup by his son, Qaboos.
 July 30 – Damages totalling £485,528 are awarded to 28 Thalidomide victims.

August

 August 11 – Creation of the International Council of Organizations of Folklore Festivals and Folk Arts in Confolens, France.
 August 17 - Venera program: Venera 7 is launched toward Venus. It later becomes the first spacecraft to successfully transmit data from the surface of another planet.
 August 31 - An annular solar eclipse is visible in Oceania, and is the 14th solar eclipse of Solar Saros 144.

September

 September 1 – An assassination attempt against King Hussein of Jordan precipitates the Black September crisis.
 September 3–6 – Israeli forces fight Palestinian guerillas in southern Lebanon
September 4 – Chilean Socialist Senator Salvador Allende wins 36.2% of the vote in his run for presidency defeating former right-wing President Jorge Alessandri with 34.9% of the votes and Christian Democrat Radomiro Tomic with 27.8% of the votes.
September 5 – Vietnam War: Operation Jefferson Glenn: The United States 101st Airborne Division and the South Vietnamese 1st Infantry Division initiate a new operation in Thua Thien Province (the operation ends in October 1971).
 September 6 – Dawson's Field hijackings, The Popular Front for the Liberation of Palestine hijacks four passenger aircraft from Pan Am, TWA and Swissair on flights to New York from Brussels, Frankfurt and Zürich and flies them to a desert airstrip in Jordan.
 September 7 – Fighting breaks out between Arab guerillas and government forces in Amman, Jordan.
 September 8–10 – The Jordanian government and Palestinian guerillas make repeated unsuccessful truces.
 September 9 – Guinea recognizes the German Democratic Republic.
 September 10 - Cambodian government forces break the siege of Kompong Tho after three months.
 September 15 – King Hussein of Jordan forms a military government with Muhammad Daoud as the prime minister.
 September 17 – "Black September": King Hussein of Jordan orders the Jordanian Armed Forces to oust Palestinian fedayeen from Jordan.
 September 19 – Kostas Georgakis, a Greek student of geology, sets himself ablaze in Matteotti Square in Genoa, Italy, as a protest against the dictatorial Greek junta led by Georgios Papadopoulos.
 September 20
 Syrian armored forces cross the Jordanian border.
 Luna 16 lands on the Moon and lifts off the next day with samples, landing back on Earth September 24.
 September 21 – Palestinian armed forces reinforce guerillas in Irbidi, Jordan.
 September 22
 The International Hydrographic Organization (IHO) is founded.
 Tunku Abdul Rahman resigns as prime minister of Malaysia, and is succeeded by his deputy Tun Abdul Razak.
 September 27
 Richard Nixon begins a tour of Europe, visiting Italy, Yugoslavia, Spain, the United Kingdom and Ireland.
 Pope Paul VI names Saint Teresa of Ávila as the first female Doctor of the Church.
 September 28 – Vice President Anwar Sadat is named temporary president of Egypt following the death of Gamal Abdel Nasser.
 September 29 – In Berlin, Red Army Faction members rob three banks, with loot totaling over DM 200,000.

October

 October 2 – The Wichita State University football team's "Gold" plane crashes in Colorado, killing most of the players. They were on their way (along with administrators and fans) to a game with Utah State University.
 October 3
 In Lebanon, the government of Prime Minister Rashid Karami resigns.
 The National Oceanic and Atmospheric Administration (NOAA) is formed.
 The Weather Bureau is renamed to National Weather Service, as part of NOAA.
 Pope Paul VI names Saint Catherine of Siena as the second female Doctor of the Church.
 October 4
 Jochen Rindt becomes Formula One World Driving Champion, the first to earn the honor posthumously.
 In Bolivia, Army Commander General Rogelio Miranda and a group of officers rebel and demand the resignation of President Alfredo Ovando Candía, who fires him.
 October 5 – The Front de libération du Québec (FLQ) kidnaps James Cross in Montreal and demands release of all its imprisoned members, beginning Quebec's October Crisis. The next day the Canadian government announces that it will not meet the demand.
 October 6
 Bolivian President Alfredo Ovando Candía resigns; General Rogelio Miranda takes over but resigns soon after.
 October 7 – General Juan José Torres becomes the new President of Bolivia.
 October 8
 The U.S. Foreign Office announces the renewal of arms sales to Pakistan.
 Soviet author Aleksandr Solzhenitsyn is awarded the Nobel Prize in Literature.
 Vietnam War: In Paris, a Communist delegation rejects U.S. President Richard Nixon's peace proposal as "a maneuver to deceive world opinion."
 October 9 – The Khmer Republic is proclaimed in Cambodia, escalating the Cambodian Civil War between the government and the Khmer Rouge.
 October 10
 Fiji becomes independent.
 October Crisis: In Montreal, Quebec Minister of Labour Pierre Laporte becomes the second statesman kidnapped by members of the FLQ terrorist group.
 October 11 – Eleven French soldiers are killed in a shootout with rebels in Chad.
 October 12 – Vietnam War: U.S. President Richard Nixon announces that the United States will withdraw 40,000 more troops before Christmas.
 October 13 – Saeb Salam forms a government in Lebanon.
 October 14 – A Chinese nuclear test is conducted in Lop Nor.
 October 15
 A section of the new West Gate Bridge in Melbourne collapses into the river below, killing 35 construction workers.
 In Egypt, a referendum supports Anwar Sadat 90.04%.
 October 16 – October Crisis: The Canadian government declares a state of emergency and outlaws the Quebec Liberation Front.
 October 17
 October Crisis: Pierre Laporte is found murdered in south Montreal.
 A cholera epidemic breaks out in Istanbul.
 Anwar Sadat officially becomes President of Egypt.
 October 20
 The Soviet Union launches the Zond 8 lunar probe.
 Egyptian president Anwar Sadat names Mahmoud Fawzi as his prime minister.
 October 22 – Chilean army commander René Schneider is shot in Santiago; the government declares a state of emergency. Schneider dies October 25.
 October 23 – Gary Gabelich sets a land speed record in a rocket-powered automobile called the Blue Flame, fueled with natural gas.
 October 24 – Salvador Allende is elected President of Chile by a run-off vote in the National Congress
 October 25 – The wreck of the Confederate submarine Hunley is found off Charleston, South Carolina, by pioneer underwater archaeologist, Dr. E. Lee Spence, then just 22 years old. Hunley was the first submarine in history to sink a ship in warfare.
 October 28
 In Jordan, the government of Ahmad Toukan resigns; the next prime minister is Wasfi al-Tal.
 A cholera outbreak in eastern Slovakia causes Hungary to close its border with Czechoslovakia.
The record, the first above 1,000 km/h, stands for nearly 13 years.
 October 30 – In Vietnam, the worst monsoon to hit the area in six years causes large floods, kills 293, leaves 200,000 homeless and virtually halts the Vietnam War.

November

 November 1 
 The Club Cinq-Sept fire in Saint-Laurent-du-Pont, France, kills 146.
 Polish Deputy Foreign Minister Zygfryd Wolniak and three Pakistanis are killed in an attack on a group of Polish diplomats at the Karachi airport.
 November 3
 Salvador Allende takes office as president of Chile.
 The 1970 Bhola cyclone makes landfall in modern-day Bangladesh around high tide, causing $86.4 million in damage (1970 USD, $576 million 2020 USD) and becomes the world's deadliest storm killing over 500,000 people.
 November 5 – Vietnam War: The United States Military Assistance Command in Vietnam reports the lowest weekly American soldier death toll in five years (24 soldiers die that week, which is the fifth consecutive week the death toll is below 50; 431 are reported wounded that week, however).
 November 8 – Egypt, Libya and Sudan announce their intentions to form a federation.
 November 9
 The Soviet Union launches Luna 17.
 Vietnam War: The Supreme Court of the United States votes 6–3 not to hear a case by the state of Massachusetts, about the constitutionality of a state law granting Massachusetts residents the right to refuse military service in an undeclared war.
 November 13
 1970 Bhola cyclone: A 120-mph (193 km/h) tropical cyclone hits the densely populated Ganges Delta region of East Pakistan (now Bangladesh), killing an estimated 500,000 people (considered the 20th century's worst cyclone disaster). It gives rise to the temporary island of New Moore / South Talpatti.
 Hafez al-Assad comes to power in Syria, following a military coup within the Ba'ath Party.
 November 14
 Southern Airways Flight 932 crashes in Wayne County, West Virginia; all 75 on board, including 37 players and 5 coaches from the Marshall University football team, are killed.
 The Soviet Union enters the International Civil Aviation Organization, after having resisted joining the UN Agency for more than 25 years. Russian becomes the fourth official language of the ICAO.
 November 16 – The Lockheed L-1011 TriStar flies for the first time.
 November 17 – Luna programme: The Soviet Union lands Lunokhod 1 on Mare Imbrium (Sea of Rains) on the Moon. This is the first roving remote-controlled robot to land on another world, and is released by the orbiting Luna 17 spacecraft.
 November 19 – The six European Economic Community nation prime ministers meet in Munich to begin the new programme of European Political Cooperation (EPC), a unified foreign policy for a future European Union.
 November 20 – The Miss World 1970 beauty pageant, hosted by Bob Hope at the Royal Albert Hall, London is disrupted by Women's Liberation protesters. Earlier on the same evening a bomb is placed under a BBC outside broadcast vehicle by The Angry Brigade, in protest at the entry of separate black and white contestants by South Africa.
 November 21
 Syrian Prime Minister Hafez al-Assad forms a new government but retains the post of defense minister.
 In Ethiopia, the Eritrean Liberation Front kills an Ethiopian general.
 Vietnam War – Operation Ivory Coast: A joint Air Force and Army team raids the Sơn Tây prison camp in an attempt to free American POWs thought to be held there (no Americans are killed, but the prisoners have already moved to another camp; all U.S. POWs are moved to a handful of central prison complexes as a result of this raid).
 1970 Australian Senate election: The Liberal/Country Coalition Government led by Prime Minister John Gorton and the Labor Party led by Gough Whitlam each ended up with 26 seats; both suffering a swing against them. The Democratic Labor Party won an additional seat and held the balance of power in the Senate. To date, this was the last occasion where a Senate election was held without an accompanying House Of Representatives election.
 November 22 – Guinean president Ahmed Sékou Touré accuses Portugal of an attack when hundreds of mercenaries land near the capital Conakry. The Guinean army repels the landing attempts over the next three days.
 November 25 – 29 – A U.N. delegation arrives to investigate the Guinea situation.
 November 25 – In Tokyo, author and Tatenokai militia leader Yukio Mishima and his followers take over the headquarters of the Japan Self-Defense Forces in an attempted coup d'état. After Mishima's speech fails to sway public opinion towards his right-wing political beliefs, including restoration of the powers of the Emperor, he commits seppuku (public ritual suicide).
 November 27 – Bolivian artist Benjamin Mendoza tries to assassinate Pope Paul VI during his visit in Manila.
 November 28 – The Montréal Alouettes defeat the Calgary Stampeders, 23–10, to win the 58th Grey Cup.

December

 December 1
 The Italian Chamber of Deputies accepts the new divorce law.
 Ethiopia recognizes the People's Republic of China.
 The Basque ETA kidnaps West German Eugen Beihl in San Sebastián.
 Luis Echeverría becomes president of Mexico.
 December 2 – The United States Environmental Protection Agency is established.
 December 3 
 October Crisis: In Montreal, kidnapped British Trade Commissioner James Cross is released by the Front de libération du Québec terrorist group after being held hostage for 60 days. Police negotiate his release and in return the Government of Canada grants 5 terrorists from the FLQ's Chenier Cell their request for safe passage to Cuba.
 Burgos Trial: In Burgos, Spain, the trial of 16 Basque terrorism suspects begins.
 December 4
 The Spanish government declares a 3-month martial law in the Basque county of Guipuzcoa, over strikes and demonstrations.
 The U.N. announces that Portuguese navy and army units were responsible for the attempted invasion of Guinea.
 December 5
 The Asian and Australian tour of Pope Paul VI ends.
 Fluminense wins the Brazil Football Championship.
 December 7
 Giovanni Enrico Bucher, the Swiss ambassador to Brazil, is kidnapped in Rio de Janeiro; kidnappers demand the release of 70 political prisoners.
 The U.N. General Assembly supports the isolation of South Africa for its apartheid policies.
 During his visit to the Polish capital, German Chancellor Willy Brandt goes down on his knees in front of a monument to the victims of the Warsaw Ghetto, which will become known as the Warschauer Kniefall ("Warsaw Genuflection").
 December 12 – A landslide in western Colombia leaves 200 dead.
 December 15
 The USSR's Venera 7 becomes the first spacecraft to land successfully on Venus and transmit data back to Earth.
 The South Korean ferry Namyong Ho capsizes off Korea Strait; 308 people are killed.
 December 16 – The Ethiopian government declares a state of emergency in the county of Eritrea over the activities of the Eritrean Liberation Front.
 December 20 – An Egyptian delegation leaves for Moscow to ask for economic and military aid.
 December 21 – The Grumman F-14 Tomcat makes its first flight.
 December 22
 The Libyan Revolutionary Council declares that it will nationalize all foreign banks in the country.
 Franz Stangl, the ex-commander of Treblinka, is sentenced to life imprisonment.
 December 23
 The Bolivian government releases Régis Debray.
 Law 70-001 is enacted in the Democratic Republic of the Congo, amending article 4 of the constitution and making the country a one-party state.
 December 25 – The ETA releases Eugen Beihl.
 December 27 – President of India V. V. Giri declares new elections.
 December 28 – The suspected killers of Pierre Laporte, Jacques and Paul Rose and Francis Sunard, are arrested near Montreal.
 December 29 – U.S. President Richard Nixon signs into law the Occupational Safety and Health Act.
 December 30 – In Biscay in the Basque country of Spain, 15,000 go on strike in protest at the Burgos trial death sentences. Francisco Franco commutes the sentences to 30 years in prison.
 December 31 – Paul McCartney sues in Britain to dissolve The Beatles' legal partnership.

Date unknown
 The first Regional Technical Colleges open in Ireland.
 Sada Abe, Japanese former prostitute and later actress, disappears.
 The Sweet Track is discovered in England. It was the world's oldest engineered roadway at the time of its discovery.
 Alvin Toffler publishes his book Future Shock.
 Sammlung zeitgenössischer Kunst der Bundesrepublik Deutschland, the Federal collection of contemporary art, is established in Germany.
 Xerox PARC computer laboratory opens in Palo Alto, California.
 A multi-business conglomerate, Virgin Group was founded by Richard Branson in England.

World population

Births

January  

 January 2
 Oksana Omelianchik, Soviet artistic gymnast
 Eric Whitacre, American composer
 January 9 – Lara Fabian, Canadian/Belgian singer
 January 12 – Zack de la Rocha, American musician
 January 13
 Marco Pantani, Italian cyclist (d. 2004)
 Shonda Rhimes, American TV producer and writer
 January 17 – Genndy Tartakovsky, Russian-American animator
 January 18 – DJ Quik, American rapper and producer
 January 20 – Skeet Ulrich, American actor
 January 21 – Ken Leung, American actor
 January 22 – Alex Ross, American comic artist
 January 24 – Matthew Lillard, American actor, presenter, director, and producer 
 January 29
 Heather Graham, American actress
 Paul Ryan, American politician
 January 30 – Hans Vonk, South African footballer
 January 31 – Minnie Driver, English actress

February  

 February 1 – Malik Sealy, American basketball player (d. 2000)
 February 3 
 Warwick Davis, English actor 
 Anthony Russo, American film and television director
 February 4 – Hunter Biden, American attorney and son of U.S. president Joe Biden
 February 8 – Alonzo Mourning, American basketball player
 February 9 – Glenn McGrath, Australian test cricketer
 February 10 – Ardy Wiranata, Indonesian badminton player
 February 13 – Park Hee-soon, South Korean actor
 February 14 – Simon Pegg, British comedian, actor, and screenwriter
 February 15 – Shepard Fairey, American temporary street artist, graphic designer, activist, illustrator, and founder of OBEY (clothing)
 February 16 – Armand Van Helden, American DJ and music producer
 February 17
 Tommy Moe, American Alpine skier
 Dominic Purcell, English-Australian actor
 February 18 – Susan Egan, American actress, voice actress, singer and dancer
 February 19 – Bellamy Young, American actress
 February 26 – Cathrine Lindahl, Swedish curler
 February 28
 Daniel Handler, American author
 Noureddine Morceli, Algerian athlete

March

 March 1 – Warren Davidson, American politician
 March 2 – Alexander Armstrong, English comedian, actor and presenter
 March 3 – Julie Bowen, American actress
 March 5
 John Frusciante, American rock musician
 Lisa Robin Kelly, American actress (d. 2013)
 Aleksandar Vučić, President of Serbia
 March 7 
 Petra Mede, Swedish comedian, dancer, actress and television presenter
 Rachel Weisz, British-American actress
 March 10 
 Antonio Edwards, American football player
 Michel van der Aa, Dutch composer
 March 13 – Carme Chacón, Spanish politician (d. 2017)
 March 16 – Paul Oscar (Páll Óskar Hjálmtýsson), Icelandic pop singer, songwriter and disc jockey 
 March 18 – Queen Latifah, American rapper and actress 
 March 20 
 Bernhard Hoëcker, German comedian
 Linda Larkin, American actress and voice actress
 Michael Rapaport, American actor
 March 21 
 Jaya, Filipino pop singer
 Cenk Uygur, Turkish-American political commentator, activist, and attorney
 March 22 – Leontien van Moorsel, Dutch cyclist
 March 23 – Gianni Infantino, Swiss football administrator
 March 24
 Lara Flynn Boyle, American actress
 Sharon Corr, Irish musician
 March 27
 Maribel Díaz Cabello, Peruvian educator, First Lady of Peru
 Elizabeth Mitchell, American actress
 Leila Pahlavi, Iranian princess (d. 2001)
 March 28 – Vince Vaughn, American actor, writer, and producer
 March 30 – Secretariat, American Thoroughbred racehorse (d. 1989)
 March 31 – Alenka Bratušek, 7th Prime Minister of Slovenia

April

 April 4 
 Rebekka Bakken, Norwegian singer
 Barry Pepper, Canadian actor
 April 7 – Rosey, Samoan-American professional wrestler (d. 2017)
 April 8 – Andrej Plenković, 12th Prime Minister of Croatia
 April 10
 José Paulo Lanyi, Brazilian journalist, writer and filmmaker
 Q-Tip, American musician and actor
 Kenny Lattimore, American R&B singer
 April 11 – Trevor Linden, Canadian hockey player
 April 13 – Ricky Schroder, American actor
 April 14 – Anna Kinberg Batra, Swedish politician
 April 17 – Redman, American rapper and actor
 April 18
 Heike Friedrich, German swimmer
 Saad Hariri, 2-Time Prime Minister of Lebanon
 April 19 – Luis Miguel, Mexican singer
 April 20 – Shemar Moore, American actor
 April 21
 Rob Riggle, American actor and comedian
 Nicole Sullivan, American actress, comedian, and writer
 April 22 – Regine Velasquez, Filipino singer and actress
 April 23
 Sadao Abe, Japanese actor
 Andrew Gee, Australian rugby league footballer
 Hans Välimäki, Finnish cook
 April 25
 Kate Allen, Australian born-Austrian triathlete
 Tomoko Kawakami, Japanese voice actress (d. 2011)
 Jason Lee, American skateboarder and actor
 April 26
 Melania Trump, Slovenian model, First Lady of the United States
 Tionne Watkins (T-Boz), American actress and singer-songwriter
 April 28
 Kurt Eversley, Guyanese-born former cricketer
 Nicklas Lidström, Swedish hockey player
 Diego Simeone, Argentine footballer and manager
 April 29
 Andre Agassi, American tennis player
 Uma Thurman, American actress
 April 30 – Halit Ergenç, Turkish actor

May

 May 3
 Bobby Cannavale, American actor
 Ariel Hernandez, Cuban boxer
 May 4 
 Will Arnett, Canadian actor
 Dawn Staley, American basketball coach
 May 5 – Zorana Mihajlović, Serbian politician
 May 6
 Roland Kun, Nauruan politician
 Ade Rai, Indonesian bodybuilder
 May 8
 Michael Bevan, Australian cricketer
 Luis Enrique, Spanish footballer
 Naomi Klein, Canadian author and activist
 May 9
 Hao Haidong, Chinese footballer
 Ghostface Killah, American rapper
 May 10
 Craig Mack, American rapper (d. 2018)
 Angelica Agurbash, Belarusian singer and model
 May 11 – Pooja Bedi, Indian actress
 May 12 – Samantha Mathis, American actress
 May 15 
 Ronald and Frank de Boer, Dutch footballers
 Ben Wallace, British politician
 May 16 – Gabriela Sabatini, Argentine tennis player
 May 17 
 Jordan Knight, American singer
 Giovanna Trillini, Italian fencer
 May 18 – Tina Fey, American comedian and actress
 May 19 – K.J. Choi, South Korean golfer
 May 20 
Juliana Pasha, Albanian singer
Louis Theroux, Singaporean-English journalist and producer
 May 21 – Once Mekel, Indonesian singer 
 May 22 – Naomi Campbell, British model and actress
 May 25
 Jamie Kennedy, American actor and comedian
 Octavia Spencer, American actress
 May 26 – Nobuhiro Watsuki, Japanese cartoonist
 May 27
 Joseph Fiennes, British actor
 Bianka Panova, Bulgarian rhythmic gymnast
 May 28 – Glenn Quinn, Irish actor (d. 2002)
 May 30 – Erick Thohir, Indonesian politician and businessman

June

 June 1
 Alexi Lalas, American soccer player                                
 R. Madhavan, Indian film actor
 Karen Mulder, Dutch model and singer
 June 2 – B-Real, American rapper
 June 3
 Ammon McNeely, American rock climber
 Peter Tägtgren, Swedish musician
 June 4 – Izabella Scorupco, Polish model and actress
 June 5 – Deborah Yates, American dancer and actress
 June 7
 Helen Baxendale, English actress
 Cafu, Brazilian footballer and politician
 Mike Modano, American hockey player
 June 8
 Gabby Giffords, American politician
 Kelli Williams, American actress
 June 13
 Rivers Cuomo, American musician, frontman of Weezer
 Mikael Ljungberg, Swedish wrestler (d. 2004)
 June 15 – Leah Remini, American actress
 June 16
 Younus AlGohar, Pakistani spiritualist
 Phil Mickelson, American golfer
 June 17
 Will Forte, American actor and comedian
 Michael Showalter, American actor, writer, and director
 June 19 – Quincy Watts, American athlete
 June 20
 Russell Garcia, British field hockey player
 Moulay Rachid, Prince of Morocco
 Michelle Reis, Hong Kong actress and beauty queen
 Athol Williams, South African poet and social philosopher
 June 21 – Pete Rock, American rapper and DJ
 June 22
 Michel Elefteriades, Greek-Lebanese politician, artist, producer and businessman
 Michael Trucco, American actor
 June 23 – Marko Albrecht, German disc jockey and electronic producer
 June 24
 Glenn Medeiros, American singer and songwriter
 Daniel Sánchez Arévalo, Spanish screenwriter and film director
 June 25 – Pan Lingling, Singaporean actress
 June 26
 Paul Thomas Anderson, American screenwriter and director
 Sean Hayes, American actor
 Paweł Nastula, Polish judoka and mixed martial artist
 Chris O'Donnell, American actor
 Nick Offerman, American actor, writer and carpenter
 June 27 – Ahmed Ahmed, Egyptian-born American actor and comedian
 June 30 
 Leonardo Sbaraglia, Argentine actor
 Erica Sjöström, Swedish female singer and saxophonist

July

 July 1 – Joni Ernst, American politician
 July 2 
 Derrick Adkins, American Olympic athlete
 Yap Kim Hock, Malaysian badminton player
 Steve Morrow, Northern Irish footballer
 Kym Ng, Singaporean television host and actress
 July 3
 Serhiy Honchar, Ukrainian road racing cyclist
 Audra McDonald, American actress and singer
 Aşkın Nur Yengi, Turkish singer and actress
 Teemu Selänne, Finnish hockey player
 July 7 
 Wayne McCullough, Northern Irish boxer
 Masai Ujiri, Nigerian professional basketball executive
 Atli Örvarsson, Icelandic film score composer
 July 8 
 Beck, American singer-songwriter and record producer
 Atul Agnihotri, Indian film actor, producer, and director
 Micky Hoogendijk, Dutch actress, presenter, model and professional photographer
 Todd Martin, American tennis player
 July 10
 Jason Orange, British singer
 John Simm, British actor
 July 11 – Justin Chambers, American actor and fashion model
 July 12
 Lee Byung-hun, South Korean actor, singer and model
 Aure Atika, French actress, writer and director
 July 13 – Bruno Salomone, French actor and comedian
 July 17 
 Jang Hyun-sung, South Korean actor
 Gavin McInnes, Canadian writer and political commentator (co-founder of Vice Media)
 July 19 – Nicola Sturgeon, First Minister of Scotland (2014-present)
 July 20 – Tunku Abdul Majid
 July 22 – Jonathan Zaccaï, Belgian actor, film director and screenwriter
 July 23 
 Thea Dorn, German writer
 Saulius Skvernelis, Prime Minister of Lithuania
 July 28 – Isabelle Brasseur, Canadian figure skater
 July 30 – Christopher Nolan, English screenwriter and director

August

 August 1
 David James, English football goalkeeper
 Elon Lindenstrauss, Israeli mathematician
 August 2 – Kevin Smith, American screenwriter, film director, and actor
 August 3 – Masahiro Sakurai, Japanese video game director, designer and writer
 August 4 – Hakeem Jeffries, American politician
 August 5 – Konstantin Yeryomenko, Russian futsal player (d. 2010)
 August 6 – M. Night Shyamalan, Indian-American film director and writer 
 August 10
 Brendon Julian, New Zealand cricket player
 Steve Mautone, Australian football player and coach
 August 11 – Daniella Perez, Brazilian actress and ballerina (d. 1992) 
 August 13 – Alan Shearer, English footballer
 August 14 – Leah Purcell, Australian actress
 August 15 – Anthony Anderson, American actor
 August 16 
 Saif Ali Khan, Indian actor
 Manisha Koirala, Indian actress
 August 17
 Jim Courier, American tennis player
 Tammy Townsend, American actress and singer
 August 18 – Malcolm-Jamal Warner, American actor
 August 19 – Fat Joe, American rapper, songwriter, actor, record producer and record executive
 August 20
 Els Callens, Belgian tennis player
 Fred Durst, American rapper
 August 21
 Erik Dekker, Dutch professional cyclist
 Cathy Weseluck, Canadian actress and comedian
 August 22
 Giada De Laurentiis, Italian-American celebrity chef
 Ricco Groß, German biathlete
 Tímea Nagy, Hungarian fencer
 August 23
 Jay Mohr, American actor and comedian
 River Phoenix, American actor (d. 1993)
 August 25 – Claudia Schiffer, German model
 August 26 
 Olimpiada Ivanova, Russian race walker
 Melissa McCarthy, American actress, comedian, and film producer
 August 27
 Peter Ebdon, English snooker player
 Jim Thome, American baseball player, MLB Hall of Fame member
 Karl Unterkircher, Italian mountaineer (d. 2008)
 August 29 – Alessandra Negrini, Brazilian actress
 August 30 – Guang Liang, Malaysian singer
 August 31
 Debbie Gibson, American singer
 Queen Rania of Jordan, Queen consort of Jordan

September

 September 1 
 Hwang Jung-min, South Korean actor
 Padma Lakshmi,  Indian-born American author, activist, actress and model
 September 3 – Jeremy Glick, passenger on board United Airlines Flight 93 (d. 2001)
 September 4
 Daisy Dee, Dutch singer and actress
 Ione Skye, British-born American actress
 September 5 – Kim Hye-soo, South Korean actress
 September 7 
 Gao Min, Chinese diver
 Tom Everett Scott, American actor
 September 8 – Benny Ibarra, Mexican singer
 September 10 – Julie Halard-Decugis, French tennis player
 September 11
 Taraji P. Henson, American actress
 Laura Wright, American actress
 September 12 – Amala Akkineni, Indian actress, dancer and activist
 September 14 
 Ketanji Brown Jackson, American jurist and associate justice of the Supreme Court of the United States
 Mike Burns, American soccer player
 September 17 – Valeria Cappellotto, Italian racing cyclist. (d. 2015)
September 18 
 Darren Gough, English cricketer
 Aisha Tyler, American actress, comedian, director, and talk show host
 September 19
 Dan Bylsma, American ice hockey player
 Takanori Nishikawa, Japanese singer
 September 20 – Gert Verheyen, Belgian footballer
 September 21 – Samantha Power, Irish-American government official and writer
 September 22 – Emmanuel Petit, French footballer
 September 23 – Ani DiFranco, American musician
 September 25 
 David Benioff, American producer and director
 Aja Kong, Japanese professional wrestler
 September 26
 Marco Etcheverry, Bolivian football player
 Yukio Iketani, Japanese gymnast
 September 27 – Yoshiharu Habu, Japanese professional shogi player
 September 28 – Kimiko Date-Krumm, Japanese tennis player
 September 29
 Ninel Conde, Mexican actress, singer, and television host
 Emily Lloyd, English actress
 Yoshihiro Tajiri, Japanese professional wrestler
 September 30 – Tony Hale, American actor

October

 October 1 – Moses Kiptanui, Kenyan athlete
 October 4 
 Olga Kuzenkova, Russian hammer thrower
 Zdravko Zdravkov, Bulgarian footballer
 October 6 – Amy Jo Johnson, American-Canadian actress
 October 7 – Nicole Ari Parker, American actress and model
 October 8
 Matt Damon, American actor
 Sadiq Khan, British politician; 3rd Mayor of London (2016–present)
 Tetsuya Nomura, Japanese video game and film director
 October 9 – Annika Sörenstam, Swedish golfer 
 October 10
 Sir Matthew Pinsent, British rower
 Jokelyn Tienstra, Dutch handball player (d. 2015)
 October 12 – Kirk Cameron, American actor and Christian activist
 October 14 – Daniela Peštová, Czech supermodel
 October 15 – Dalia El Behery, Egyptian actress, model and beauty pageant
 October 16 – Mehmet Scholl, German footballer
 October 17
 Anil Kumble, Indian cricketer
 Marciano Vink, Dutch footballer
 October 19 – Chris Kattan, American comedian and actor
 October 20 – Michelle Malkin, American political commentator
 October 21 
 Louis Koo, Hong Kong actor
 Tony Mortimer, English singer
 October 22 – Javier Milei, Argentine politician and economist
 October 24 
 Stephen Kipkorir, Kenyan middle-distance runner (d. 2008)
 Natasa Theodoridou, Greek singer
 October 25 – Adam Goldberg, American actor
 October 26 – Chavo Guerrero Jr., Mexican-American professional wrestler 
 October 27
 Adrian Erlandsson, Swedish drummer
 Jonathan Stroud, British writer of fantasy fiction
 October 29 – Edwin van der Sar, Dutch footballer
 October 30 – Nia Long, American actress
 Xie Jun, Chinese chess grandmaster
 October 31 
 Linn Berggren, Swedish singer
 Nolan North, American actor and voice actor

November

 November 1
 Toma Enache, Romanian film director
 Merle Palmiste, Estonian actress
 November 2
 Ely Buendia, Filipino rock lead singer and rhythm guitarist (Eraserheads)
 Lucy Hawking, English journalist and novelist
 Sharmell Sullivan-Huffman, American wrestling valet
 November 3 – Dawn Marie Psaltis, American professional wrestler
 November 4 – François Delapierre, French politician (d. 2015)
 November 5 – Tamzin Outhwaite, English actress, presenter and narrator 
 November 6 – Ethan Hawke, American actor, writer, and film director
 November 7 
 Marc Rosset, Swiss tennis player
 Morgan Spurlock, American filmmaker and activist
 November 8 – Tom Anderson, American co-founder of Myspace
 November 9 – Chris Jericho, professional wrestler
 November 10 – Warren G, American rapper
 November 12 – Tonya Harding, American figure skater
 November 13 – Frederick Herman, American air line pilot
 November 15 
 Uschi Disl, German biathlete
 Patrick M'Boma, Cameroonian footballer
 November 16 
 Martha Plimpton, American actress
 Beth Van Duyne, American politician
 November 17 – Paul Allender, English guitarist
 November 18 
 Megyn Kelly, American journalist and television host
 Peta Wilson, Australian actress
 Mike Epps, American stand-up comedian and actor
 November 21 – Karen Davila, Filipina journalist, TV host and news personality
 November 22 – Joe Son, Korean-American actor, wrestler, and convicted felon
 November 23 – Oded Fehr, Israeli-American actor
 November 24 – Julieta Venegas, American born-Mexican singer, guitarist and producer
 November 25 – Eluana Englaro, Italian patient in right-to-die case (d. 2009)
 November 26 – Dave Hughes, Australian comedian
 November 27 – Jorge Luis González Tanquero, Cuban dissident (d. 2016)
 November 28 
 Richard Osman, English television presenter, producer and director
 Édouard Philippe, French politician, 100th Prime Minister of France
 November 30
 Yayuk Basuki, Indonesian tennis player
 Natalie Williams, American basketball player

December

 
 

 December 1 – Sarah Silverman, American stand-up comedian, actress, singer, producer, and writer
 December 3 
 Christian Karembeu, French footballer
 Jimmy Shergill, Indian actor
 December 4 – Kevin Sussman, American actor and comedian
 December 5
 Tim Hetherington, English-born photojournalist (d. 2011)
 Martin Selmayr, German Eurocrat
 December 6 – Michaela Schaffrath, German actress
 December 9 – Kara DioGuardi, American songwriter, producer and singer
 December 11 – Chris Henderson, American soccer player
 December 12
 Mädchen Amick, American actress
 Jennifer Connelly, American actress
 Regina Hall, American actress
 December 14 – Andrew Lewis, Guyanese professional boxer (d. 2015)
 December 15
Babul Supriyo, Indian singer and politician 
Przemysław Truściński, Polish artist
 December 17
 Craig Doyle, Irish television presenter
 Sean Patrick Thomas, American actor
 December 18
 DMX, American rapper and actor (d. 2021)
 Rob Van Dam, American professional wrestler
 December 20 – Massimo Ellul, Maltese entrepreneur and philanthropist
 December 22 
 Ted Cruz, Canadian-American politician, U.S. Senator (R-Tx.) from 2013 and 2016 presidential candidate
 Gary Anderson, Scottish darts player
 December 23 – Catriona Le May Doan, Canadian speed skater
 December 25 – Emmanuel Amuneke, Nigerian footballer
 December 26 – Krissada Sukosol Clapp, Thai actor and singer
 December 28  
 Yolanda Andrade, Mexican actress and television presenter
 Elaine Hendrix, American actress
 December 29
 Aled Jones, Welsh singer and television presenter
 Kevin Weisman, American actor

Deaths

January–February

 January 5 – Max Born, German physicist, Nobel Prize laureate (b. 1882)
 January 10 – Pavel Belyayev, Soviet cosmonaut (b. 1925)
 January 18 – David O. McKay, 9th president of the Church of Jesus Christ of Latter-day Saints (b. 1873)
 January 25 – Eiji Tsuburaya, Japanese film director and special effects designer (b. 1901)
 January 27 – Erich Heckel, German painter (b. 1883)
 January 29
 Basil Liddell Hart, British military historian (b. 1895)
 Thelma Morgan, American socialite (b. 1904)
 January 30 – Fritz Bayerlein, German general (b. 1899)
 January 31 – Slim Harpo, American singer (b. 1924)
 February 2 – Bertrand Russell, British logician and philosopher, recipient of the Nobel Prize in Literature (b. 1872)
 February 3 – Italo Gariboldi, Italian general (b. 1879)
 February 7 – Abe Attell, American boxer (b. 1883)
 February 14
 Arthur Edeson, American cinematographer (b. 1891)
 Harry Stradling, American cinematographer (b. 1901)
 February 15 – Hugh Dowding, 1st Baron Dowding, British RAF Fighter Commander during the Battle of Britain (b. 1882)
 February 16 – Francis Peyton Rous, American pathologist, recipient of the Nobel Prize in Physiology or Medicine (b. 1879)
 February 17
 Shmuel Yosef Agnon, Israeli writer, Nobel Prize laureate (b. 1888)
 Alfred Newman, American film composer (b. 1900)
 February 19 – Jules Munshin, American actor (b. 1915)
 February 20 
 Café Filho, Brazilian politician, 18th President of Brazil (b. 1899)
 Sophie Treadwell, American playwright and journalist (b. 1885)
 February 22 – Dora Boothby, English tennis champion (b. 1881)
 February 24 – Conrad Nagel, American actor (b. 1897)

March–April

 March 6 – William Hopper, American actor (b. 1915)
 March 11 – Erle Stanley Gardner, American crime writer (b. 1889)
 March 15 – Arthur Adamov, Russian-French playwright (b. 1908)
 March 16 – Tammi Terrell, American singer (b. 1945)
 March 18 – William Beaudine, American film director (b. 1892)
 March 21 – Marlen Haushofer, Austrian author (b. 1920)
 March 29 – Vera Brittain, British writer (b. 1893)
 March 30 – Heinrich Brüning, German academic and politician, 21st Chancellor of Germany (b. 1885)
 March 31 – Semyon Timoshenko, Soviet general, Marshal of the Soviet Union (b. 1895)
 April 1 – Polina Zhemchuzhina, Soviet politician (b. 1897)
 Ludolf von Alvensleben, German Nazi functionary, SS and Police Leader (b. 1901)
 April 5 
Louisa Bolus, South African botanist and taxonomist (b. 1877)
Alfred Henry Sturtevant, American geneticist (b. 1891)
 April 6 – Maurice Stokes, American basketball player (b. 1933)
 April 8 
 Prince Felix of Bourbon-Parma, consort of Grand Duchess Charlotte (b. 1893)
 Julius Pokorny, Austrian-born Czech linguist (b. 1887)
 April 11 – Cathy O'Donnell, American actress (b. 1923)
 April 16 – Richard Neutra, Austrian-born American architect (b. 1892)
 April 17 – Patriarch Alexy I of Moscow (b. 1877)
 April 18 – Michał Kalecki, Polish economist (b. 1899)
 April 26
 Francisco Cunha Leal, Portuguese politician, 84th Prime Minister of Portugal (b. 1888)
 Gypsy Rose Lee, American actress (b. 1911)
 April 27 – Arthur Shields, Irish actor (b. 1896)
 April 28 – Ed Begley, American actor (b. 1901)
 April 30 – Inger Stevens, Swedish-American actress (b. 1934)

May

 May 1
 Ralph Hartley, American inventor (b. 1888)
 Yi Un, Crown Prince of Korea (b. 1897)
 May 9 – Walter P. Reuther, American labor union leader and president of the United Auto Workers (b. 1907)
 May 11 – Johnny Hodges, American jazz musician (b. 1907)
 May 12
 Władysław Anders, General of the Polish Army (b. 1892)
 Nelly Sachs, German writer, Nobel Prize laureate (b. 1891)
 May 13 – Sir William Dobell, Australian artist (b. 1899)
 May 14 – Billie Burke, American actress (b. 1884)
 May 17 – Heinz Hartmann, Austrian psychiatrist and psychoanalyst (b. 1894)
 May 24 – Phan Khắc Sửu, South Vietnamese politician and Chief of State of the Republic of Vietnam (b. 1893)
 May 28 – Iuliu Hossu, Romanian Roman Catholic bishop and servant of God (b. 1885)
 May 29 
 John Gunther, American writer (b. 1901)
 Eva Hesse, German-born American sculptor (b. 1936)
 May 31 – Terry Sawchuk, Canadian ice hockey player (b. 1929)

June

 June 1 – Pedro Eugenio Aramburu, 31st President of Argentina (b. 1903)
 June 2 – Bruce McLaren, founder of McLaren Racing (b. 1937)
 June 3 – Hjalmar Schacht, Nazi German economic minister (b. 1877)
 June 7 
 E. M. Forster, English writer (b. 1879)
 Manuel Gómez-Moreno Martínez, Spanish archaeologist and historian (b. 1870)
 Prudencia Grifell, Spanish-born Mexican actress (b. 1879)
 June 8 – Abraham Maslow, American psychologist (b. 1908)
 June 9 – Rafael Ángel Calderón Guardia, 19th President of Costa Rica (b. 1900)
 June 10 – Bartolomé Blanche, Chilean military officer, provisional President of Chile (b. 1879)
 June 11 – Alexander Kerensky, Russian revolutionary politician (b. 1881)
 June 14 – Roman Ingarden, Polish philosopher (b. 1893)
 June 15 – José de Almada Negreiros, Portuguese artist (b. 1893)
 June 16 – Heino Eller, Estonian composer and composition teacher (b. 1887)
 June 21 – Sukarno, 1st President of Indonesia (b. 1901)
 June 26 – Leopoldo Marechal, Argentine writer (b. 1900)

July

 July 6 – Marjorie Rambeau, American actress (b. 1889)
 July 7 – Sylvester Wiere, Austro-Hungarian-born American slapstick comedian, member of the Wiere Brothers (b. 1909)
 July 10 – Bjarni Benediktsson, 11th Prime Minister of Iceland (b. 1908)
 July 11 – André Lurçat, French modernist architect, landscape architect, (b. 1894)
 July 13 
 Leslie Groves, American general, director of the Manhattan Project (b. 1896)
 Sheng Shicai, Chinese warlord (b. 1895)
 July 14 – Luis Mariano, Spanish tenor (b. 1914)
 July 19
 Egon Eiermann, German architect (b. 1904)
 Panagiotis Pipinelis, former Prime Minister of Greece (b. 1899)
 July 22 – Fritz Kortner, Austrian-born director (b. 1892)
 July 23 – Amadeo Bordiga, Italian Marxist (b. 1889)
 July 27 – António de Oliveira Salazar, Portuguese economist and politician, 100th Prime Minister of Portugal (b. 1889)
 July 29 – Sir John Barbirolli, English conductor (b. 1899)
 July 30 – George Szell, Hungarian conductor (b. 1897)

August

 August 1
 Frances Farmer, American actress and television host (b. 1913)
 Giuseppe Pizzardo, Italian Roman Catholic cardinal (b. 1877)
 Otto Heinrich Warburg, German physician and physiologist, Nobel Prize in Physiology or Medicine laureate (b. 1883)
 August 10 – Bernd Alois Zimmermann, German composer (b. 1918)
 August 12 – Glenn Hartranft, American athlete (b. 1901)
 August 18 – Soledad Miranda, Spanish actress (b. 1943)
 August 20 – Zeki Velidi Togan, Turkish historian (b. 1890)
 August 22 – Vladimir Propp, Soviet folklorist (b. 1895)
 August 23 – Abdallah Khalil, 3rd Prime Minister of Sudan (b. 1892)
 August 30 – Del Moore, American actor, comedian and radio announcer (b. 1916)

September

 September 1 – François Mauriac, French writer, Nobel Prize laureate (b. 1885)
 September 2
 Marie-Pierre Kœnig, French general and politician (b. 1898)
 Kees van Baaren, Dutch composer (b. 1906)
 September 3 
 Vince Lombardi, American football player and coach (b. 1913)
 Alan Wilson, American musician (Canned Heat) (b. 1943)
 September 5
 Jesse Pennington, English footballer (b. 1883)
 Jochen Rindt, Austrian racing driver, 1970 Formula One Driver's Champion (b. 1942)
 September 7 – Yitzhak Gruenbaum, noted leader of the Zionist movement in the interwar period (b. 1879)
 September 14 – Rudolf Carnap, German-American philosopher and mathematician (b. 1891)
 September 18 – Jimi Hendrix, American rock musician (b. 1942)
 September 22 – Alice Hamilton, the first woman appointed to the faculty of Harvard University (b. 1869)
 September 23 – André Bourvil, French actor (b. 1917)
 September 25 – Erich Maria Remarque, German author (All Quiet On The Western Front) (b. 1898)
 September 28
 John Dos Passos, American novelist (b. 1896)
 Mahmud al-Muntasir, 1st Prime Minister of Libya (b. 1903)
 Gamal Abdel Nasser, 31st Prime Minister of Egypt and 2nd President of Egypt (b. 1918)
 September 29 – Edward Everett Horton, American actor (b. 1886)
 September 30 – Benedetto Aloisi Masella, Italian Roman Catholic cardinal (b. 1875)

October

 October 1 – Petar Konjović, Yugoslav composer (b. 1883)
 October 4 – Janis Joplin, American rock singer (b. 1943)
 October 10 – Édouard Daladier, 72nd Prime Minister of France (b. 1884)
 October 18 – Prince Zeid bin Hussein (b. 1898)
 October 19 – Lázaro Cárdenas, 44th President of Mexico (b. 1895)
 October 21
 Li Linsi, Chinese educator and diplomat (b. 1896)
 Ernest Haller, American cinematographer (b. 1896)
 October 24 – Richard Hofstadter, American historian (b. 1916)
 October 25 – René Schneider, commander-in-chief of the Chilean Army (b. 1913)

November

 November 2 
 Abram Besicovitch, Russian mathematician (b. 1891)
 Fernand Gravey, French actor (b. 1904)
 November 4 – Friedrich Kellner, German diarist (b. 1885)
 November 6 – Agustín Lara, Mexican composer (b. 1897)
 November 8 – Napoleon Hill, American author in the area of the new thought (b. 1883)
 November 9 – Charles de Gaulle, French general and statesman, 98th Prime Minister of France and 18th President of France (b. 1890)
 November 13 – Bessie Braddock, British politician (b. 1899)
 November 15 – Konstantinos Tsaldaris, Greek politician, 2-time Prime Minister of Greece (b. 1884)
 November 19 
 Andrei Yeremenko, Soviet military leader, Marshal of the Soviet Union (b. 1892)
 Maria Yudina, Soviet pianist (b. 1899)
 November 21 
 C. V. Raman, Indian physicist (b. 1888)
 Percy Ernst Schramm, German historian (b. 1894)
 November 23 – Yusof bin Ishak, Singaporean politician, 1st President of Singapore (b. 1910)
 November 25
 Louise Glaum, American actress (b. 1888)
 Yukio Mishima, Japanese novelist (b. 1925)

December

 December 2 – John H. Hoover, American admiral (b. 1887)
 December 7 – Rube Goldberg, American cartoonist (b. 1883)
 December 8 – Sir Christopher Kelk Ingold, British chemist (b. 1893)
 December 9 – Sir Feroz Khan Noon, 7th Prime Minister of Pakistan (b. 1893)
 December 14 – William Slim, 1st Viscount Slim, British field marshal and 13th Governor-General of Australia (b. 1891)
 December 15 – Ernest Marsden, English-New Zealand physicist (b. 1889)
 December 16 – Friedrich Pollock, German social scientist and philosopher (b. 1894)
 December 23 – Charlie Ruggles, American actor (b. 1886)
 December 29 – Prince Adalbert of Bavaria (b. 1886)
 December 30 – Sonny Liston, American boxer (b. c.1930)
 December 31 – Cyril Scott, English composer, writer, and poet (b. 1879)

Nobel Prizes

 Physics – Hannes Alfvén, Louis Néel
 Chemistry – Luis Federico Leloir
 Medicine – Sir Bernard Katz, Ulf von Euler, Julius Axelrod
 Literature – Aleksandr Solzhenitsyn
 Peace – Norman Borlaug
 Nobel Memorial Prize in Economic Sciences – Paul Samuelson

References